The Salvation Army Catherine Booth Hospital (CBH) is a hospital and nursing school run by the Salvation Army in Nagercoil, Kanyakumari, Tamil Nadu, India.

It is named after Catherine Booth, the wife of William Booth, the founder of the Salvation Army. This hospital was started by Capt. 
Henry John (Harry) Andrews, in the year of 1893. After he called by father of the medical work in the worldwide salvation army.

This mission hospital is situated at Vadasery, Nagercoil, which is 18  km away from Kanyakumari.  It was started in 1893 when missionary Harry Andrews treated the first patient in a tiny bath room.  Since then it has grown into a 300-bed general hospital with departments of medicine, surgery, obstetrics, gynecology, pediatrics, orthopaedics, ophthalmology, and otorhinolaryngology.

School of nursing 
The school of nursing was added in 1938.

References

External links
Catherine Booth Hospital; Picasaweb

Hospitals in Tamil Nadu
Salvation Army buildings
Nursing schools in India
Salvationism in India
Hospitals established in 1893
1893 establishments in India